Kula (Kola) or Lamtoka (Lantoka), also known as Tanglapui, is a Papuan language spoken in villages on the north coast, south coast and mountainous interior of Alor Island in Indonesia. Dialects are Kula proper, Kulatela, Watena, Kula Watena, Iramang, Larena, Sumang, and Arumaka. Most settlements where Kula is spoken are "new villages" that have only been inhabited since the 1960s. Due to this recent resettlement, and since usage of the language is discouraged in schools, Kula is an endangered language.

Phonology

The data in this section are taken from Williams (2017). Phonemes in brackets are "marginal phonemes".

Consonants

Vowels

References

External links 
 ELAR archive of Documenting Language and Interaction in Kula

Tanglapui languages
Languages of Indonesia